Andri Steinn Guðjónsson (born March 12, 1979, in Reykjavík, Iceland) is an Icelandic film editor.

Films 
The year of release and director of each film are indicated in parenthesis.
 Familien Gregersen (2004 – Charlotte Sachs Bostrup) (co-editor)
 Æblet & ormen (2009 – Anders Morgenthaler and Mads Juul)
 The Good Heart (2010 Dagur Kári)
 Submarino (2010 – Thomas Vinterberg)
 Min bedste fjende (2010 – Oliver Ussing)
 Truth About Men (2010 – Nikolaj Arcel)
 Virgin Mountain (2015 - Dagur Kári)
 Welcome to Utmark (2021 - Dagur Kári)
 Chosen (2022 - Kaspar Munk)
 Beautiful Beings (2022 - Guðmundur Arnar Guðmundsson)
 Trom (2022)
 Borgen (2022)

References

External links

Living people
1979 births
Andri Steinn
Andri Steinn